Harris County shooting may refer to:

 2014 Harris County shooting, a shooting near Spring, Texas, on July 9, 2014
 2015 Harris County shooting, a shooting near Houston, Texas, on August 8, 2015